6ixUpsideDown is the debut compilation album by 6ixBuzz. It was self-released on October 19, 2018.

Background
6ixUpsideDown is the debut compilation album by Canadian entertainment company and media platform 6ixBuzz, under their division 6ixBuzz Entertainment, which showcases Toronto hip-hop artists. Toronto rapper Drake was also sampled on the track Ah EE where he mentions the word "6ixbuzz".

The album was supported by the lead single "Up and Down" by Pressa & Houdini.

Track listing

Charts
Canadian Albums Chart (Billboard)- 87

References

6ixBuzz albums
2018 compilation albums
Hip hop compilation albums
Underground hip hop compilation albums